Pimento (or pimiento) cheese is a spread most popularly made of cheese, mayonnaise and pimientos and served on crackers and vegetables or in sandwiches.  A favorite of the cuisine of the Southern United States, it also is enjoyed elsewhere, with regional variations in ingredients.

Overview
The basic pimento cheese recipe has few ingredients: sharp cheddar cheese or processed cheese (such as Velveeta or American cheese), mayonnaise or salad dressing, and pimentos, blended to either a smooth or chunky paste. Regional ingredients include horseradish, cream cheese, salt and pepper, Louisiana-style hot sauce, Worcestershire sauce, cayenne pepper, paprika, jalapeños, onions, garlic, and dill pickles.

Pimento cheese can be served as a spread on crackers or celery, scooped onto corn chips or tortilla chips, mixed in with mashed yolks for deviled eggs, added to grits, or slathered over hamburgers or hotdogs.

A pimento cheese sandwich can be a quick and inexpensive lunch, or it can be served as a cocktail finger food (with crusts trimmed, garnished with watercress, and cut into triangles) or rolled up and cut into pinwheels.  It is also a common snack in the Philippines, where it is referred to as "cheese pimiento".

Pimento cheese has been referred to as the "pâté of the south", "Carolina caviar" and "the caviar of the South."
Pimento cheese sandwiches are a popular item at the Masters Tournament. Minor controversy ensued in 2013 when the Augusta National Golf Club switched food suppliers for the Masters and the new supplier was unable to duplicate the recipe used by the previous supplier, resulting in a sandwich with a markedly different taste.

See also

 Benedictine
 Grilled cheese sandwich
 Liptauer
 List of spreads
 Obatzda
 Palmetto Cheese 
 Urnebes

References 

Cuisine of the Southern United States
American cheeses